Route 548, or Highway 548, may refer to:

Canada
 Ontario Highway 548

India
 National Highway 548 (India)

United States

Vietnam
 Route 548, a hard-crusted dirt road that bisected the A Shau Valley lengthwise